Nikki Ahamed (born 18 April 1991) is a Sri Lankan former footballer who played as a midfielder for a number of clubs in England and Europe.

Club career

Early life
Born in Colombo, Sri Lanka, Ahamed moved to England as a child, joining the academy of Chelsea in 1999. During his time with Chelsea, he was called up to the senior squad bench, but never made a professional appearance.

After eleven years with The Blues, he was released at the end of the 2009–10 season.

Moves to Portugal and Germany
After a spell with Wealdstone and a trial with French side Châteauroux, Ahamed moved to Portugal to sign with third division Mafra. Following one season with Mafra, in which he made 5 appearances, he went on trial with Croatian side Hajduk Split.

After the unsuccessful trial in Croatia, Ahamed signed with German club FSV Frankfurt, and was assigned to their second team for the 2013–14 season. He made a total of twenty-seven appearances, scoring once.

Return to England
On his return to England, Ahamed rejoined Wealdstone, and made three appearances in the Conference South. He would go on to play for Metropolitan Police, where he made thirty-seven league appearances. He ended his career with Enfield Town.

Career statistics

Club

Notes

References

1991 births
Living people
Sri Lankan footballers
Association football midfielders
Segunda Divisão players
Hessenliga players
National League (English football) players
Isthmian League players
Chelsea F.C. players
Wealdstone F.C. players
C.D. Mafra players
FSV Frankfurt players
Metropolitan Police F.C. players
Enfield Town F.C. players
Sri Lankan expatriate footballers
Expatriate footballers in England
Expatriate footballers in Portugal
Expatriate footballers in Germany